The 2005 FIBA Asia Champions Cup was the 16th staging of the FIBA Asia Champions Cup, the basketball club tournament of FIBA Asia. The tournament was held for the first time in three cities: Quezon City, Pasay and Antipolo, in the Philippines from May 29 to June 5, 2005, with the Final being held in Araneta Coliseum.

Al-Rayyan from Qatar became the second team to win multiple titles by first dethroning the defending three-time champion Sagesse from Lebanon in the thrilling overtime game in the Semifinals, and then surviving Fastlink from Jordan in the Finals. They had previously won the championship in the 2002 edition at Kuala Lumpur.

Preliminary round

Group A

Group B

Classification 9th–10th

Final round

Quarterfinals

Semifinals 5th–8th

Semifinals

7th place

5th place

3rd place

Final

Final standing

Awards
Most Valuable Player:  Fadi El Khatib (Sagesse)
Best Rebounder:  Ayman Dais (Fastlink)
Best Passer:  Sambhaji Kadam (Young Cagers)

All-Star Team:
 Fadi El Khatib (Sagesse)
 Saad Abdulrahman (Al-Rayyan)
 Erfan Ali (Al-Rayyan)
 Enver Soobzokov (Fastlink)
 Rommel Adducul (San Miguel)

References
Goalzz
www.fibaasia.net
Results

2005
Champions Cup
Champions Cup
FIBA Asia Champions Cup 2005
Sports in Rizal
Sport in Quezon City